"Svet stromov" is a song by Marika Gombitová, released as a single by OPUS in 1980.

The composition was written by Janko Lehotský and Kamil Peteraj, being released with "Tajomstvo hier" (duet with Lehotský) on B-side .

Official versions
 "Svet stromov" - Studio version, 1980

Credits and personnel
 Marika Gombitová - lead vocal
 Janko Lehotský - lead vocal, music
 Kamil Peteraj - lyrics
 OPUS Records - copyright

References

General

Specific

1980 songs
1980 singles
Marika Gombitová songs
Songs written by Ján Lehotský
Songs written by Kamil Peteraj
Slovak-language songs